The word Kamenets (or its variants Kamenec, Kamieniec, Kamyanets or Kamianets) is a common Slavic toponym with the root kamen meaning "stone" and the suffix -ets. It usually denotes a rocky mountain or stony embankment of a river or stream.

Kamenets may refer to:

Places

Belarus
 Kamyenyets
 Kamenets District

Bulgaria
 Kamenets, Kardzhali Province

Croatia 
 Kamenac

Czech Republic 
 Kamenec (Rokycany District)
 Kamenec u Poličky

Germany 
 Kamenz, Upper Sorbian Kamjenc, Lower Sorbian Kamjeńc

Hungary
 Szombathely, Czech and Slovak historical exonym Kamenec

Ukraine
 Kamianets-Podilskyi, a town in western Ukraine
 Kamianets-Podilskyi Raion, district of the Khmelnytskyi Oblast
 Kamianets Okruha, a former administrative subdivision of the Ukrainian SSR
 Khmelnytskyi Oblast, a province in western Ukraine also known as Kamianets-Podilskyi Oblast

Slovakia
 Kamenec pod Vtáčnikom
 Malý Kamenec
 Veľký Kamenec

People
 Ivan Kamenec (born 1931), Slovak historian

See also 
 Kamenitsa (disambiguation)
 Kamieniec (disambiguation), places in Poland